Graham Road Bridge is a covered bridge which formerly spanned the west branch of the Ashtabula River in Pierpont Township, Ashtabula County, Ohio, United States.  Built from remnants of a former covered bridge that was damaged in a flood in 1913, the bridge now sits in an Ashtabula County MetroPark along the south side of Graham Road, near its original site, and is a single span Town truss design.  Relocated in 1972, it is no longer open to vehicle traffic.  The bridge’s WGCB number is 35-04-13, and it is located approximately 8.4 mi (13.5 km) east-northeast of Jefferson.

History
1913 – Bridge constructed.
1972 – Bridge moved to its current site.

Dimensions
Length: 97 feet (29.6 m)

Gallery

See also
List of Ashtabula County covered bridges

References

External links
Ohio Covered Bridges List
Ohio Covered Bridge Homepage
The Covered Bridge Numbering System
Ohio Historic Bridge Association
Giddings Road Covered Bridge from Ohio Covered Bridges, Historic Bridges

Covered bridges in Ashtabula County, Ohio
Bridges completed in 1913
Road bridges in Ohio
1913 establishments in Ohio
Relocated buildings and structures in Ohio
Wooden bridges in Ohio